, better known by his ring name , is a South Korean-Japanese retired professional wrestler who is best known for his longtime work in New Japan Pro-Wrestling (NJPW) as both a wrestler and a booker. He is considered one of Japan’s most influential wrestlers for his work in the 1980s and 1990s and is known as the first wrestler to popularize the Sasori-Gatame, better known in English as the Scorpion Deathlock or Sharpshooter. After leaving NJPW in 2002, he formed Fighting World of Japan Pro Wrestling (WJ), but eventually returned to New Japan in October 2005 as a site foreman, booker and part-time wrestler. Choshu once again left NJPW in 2010 and primarily worked in Tatsumi Fujinami’s Dradition, as well as his own self-produced Power Hall events as a freelancer.
Choshu was a second generation Zainichi Korean until his naturalization in 2016.

Early life 

Choshu was born Kwak Gwang-ung, the youngest of four children in Tokuyama, Yamaguchi Prefecture to a Japanese mother and Korean father. His father left Korea's Chungcheongbuk-do for Japan in 1939 and worked as a garbage man for much of his life. Choshu has said that he faced discrimination from teachers in elementary school due to his Korean heritage. He took part in baseball and judo as a teenager and after training in the judo department at Giyang Junior High School, he moved to the wrestling department of Yamaguchi prefecture's Sakurakaoka High School as a special student. He eventually came in second place in the 73 kg class of the Nagasaki National Freestyle wrestling tournament, which attracted attention from university wrestling officials and he later enrolled at Senshu University School of Commerce on a wrestling scholarship.

Amateur wrestling career 

Kwak joined the amateur wrestling team at Senshu University shortly after enrolling and was teammates with Mitsushi Hirasawa, the father of future NJPW wrestler Mitsuhide Hirasawa. In 1971, he won the All Japan Student Wrestling Championship in the 90 kg class. Thanks to his victory in the tournament, Kwak was selected to represent Japan in the 1972 Summer Olympics in Munich, Germany. Officials however refused to let him compete for Japan on account of him being part Korean. Nevertheless, South Korea instead invited him to join their freestyle team and he represented South Korea as a wrestler. Kwak ended the tournament with a record of 1 win and 2 losses, and was disqualified due to the penalty points system.

When he returned to Japan, Kwak became captain of the Senshu wrestling team in his fourth year at university and won the Freestyle and Greco-Roman 100 kg class tournaments at the All Japan Championship in 1973.

Professional wrestling career

Early years (1974–1987) 
He debuted in New Japan Pro-Wrestling (NJPW) in August 1974 against El Greco. In the mid-1970s, Choshu was sent to North America to gain experience.  Wrestling under his real name (Mitsuo Yoshida, sometimes referred as "Mitsu"), he appeared in George Cannon's "Superstars of Wrestling" promotion in Windsor, Ontario as a heel, managed by Superstar (or Supermouth) Dave Drasen. Choshu had a brief feud with the top fan favorite of Cannon's promotion, Luis Martinez.

The ring name at the time of debut was Mitsuo Yoshida (吉田 光雄), but from April 1977 after returning from overseas training, he adopted his famously known ring name Riki Choshu after Choshu (長州) in honor of the Choshu Forces, another name for his hometown Nagato. In the 4th World League match, which he participated in when he returned to Japan, he finished third with Nikolai Volkoff, behind winner Seiji Sakaguchi and runner-up The Masked Superstar.

Choshu was the first "traitor heel" in a Japanese promotion. In 1983, upset at not being selected for the inaugural tournament for the IWGP Heavyweight Championship, he turned on Tatsumi Fujinami during a match and formed his own stable, Ishin Gundan (Revolutionary Army), which was the core for the later Japan Pro-Wrestling (JPW) promotion that "invaded" All Japan Pro Wrestling (AJPW).

New Japan Pro-Wrestling (1987–1998) 
Upon returning to NJPW in 1987, Choshu was a part of the Takeshi Puroresu Gundan. After NJPW split ties with Takeshi Kitano over the December 27 Sumo Hall riot, Choshu slowly climbed back up into the main event picture. In June 1988, he won his first IWGP Tag Team Championship with Masa Saito, with whom he had also partnered during a brief stint in the American Wrestling Association (AWA). At the same time, he feuded with Tatsumi Fujinami over the IWGP Heavyweight Championship. On May 27, the match ended in a no contest, in which the title was held up. Fujinami won the rematch on June 24.

In July 1989, he won his first IWGP Heavyweight Championship against Salman Hashimikov of the Soviet Union. The same month, he would also win his second IWGP Tag Team title with young up-and-comer Takayuki Iizuka. Two more IWGP Heavyweight title reigns would follow between August 19, 1990 and January 4, 1992.

In August 1996, he won the G1 Climax, winning every single match in the tournament. In 1997, he won his third IWGP Tag Team title with Kensuke Sasaki. In January 1998, he retired from the ring; for his retirement match, he wrestled five matches in one night, winning four out of five matches, defeating Tatsuhito Takaiwa, Yutaka Yoshie, Jushin Thunder Liger and Kazuyuki Fujita, only to fall to his former tag team partner Takashi Iizuka. He would focus on booking matches for NJPW after that.

Comeback (2000–2019) 
Retirement did not last long, as Atsushi Onita challenged Choshu to a barbed wire deathmatch in 2000. Choshu accepted and wrestled Onita in a deadly squash, where Choshu ended up winning. He then balanced wrestling and booking for NJPW, until his departure in 2002, stemming from the departures of Keiji Mutoh and Satoshi Kojima, among others, to AJPW, which caused his position of head booker taken away.

After leaving NJPW, he formed Fighting World of Japan Pro Wrestling in 2003, which would later be changed to Riki Pro, after the failure of some of their big shows. He ran Riki Pro until 2005 when he returned to NJPW as a site foreman, booker and wrestler. In 2007, Choshu joined the Legend stable with Masahiro Chono, Jyushin Thunder Liger and AKIRA.

Choshu also promotes an occasional series of events called "LOCK UP", which feature talent from New Japan and other promotions. New Japan supported this financially until 2008 before withdrawing.

In 2012, Choshu was booked in a series of matches for LEGEND The Pro Wrestling and Dradition.

On June 26, 2019, Choshu teamed with Tomohiro Ishii and Shiro Koshinaka in a 6-man tag against Tatsumi Fujinami, Keiji Mutoh, and Togi Makabe. Fujinami's team won when Makabe pinned Choshu. In the post-match, Choshu officially announced his retirement from pro-wrestling.

Other media 
Choshu appears as a gang member in the 2017 video game Yakuza Kiwami 2, alongside Genichiro Tenryu, Keiji Mutoh, Masahiro Chono and Tatsumi Fujinami.

Championships and accomplishments 

 All Japan Pro Wrestling
 NWA International Tag Team Championship (1 time) – with Yoshiaki Yatsu
 PWF World Heavyweight Championship (1 time)
 Fighting World of Japan Pro Wrestling
 WMG Tag Team Championship (1 time) – with Genichiro Tenryu
International Professional Wrestling Hall of Fame
Class of 2022
 New Japan Pro-Wrestling
Greatest 18 Championship (1 time)
 IWGP Heavyweight Championship (3 times)
 IWGP Tag Team Championship (3 times) – with Masa Saito (1), Takashi Iizuka (1), and Kensuke Sasaki (1)
 NWA North American Tag Team Championship (Los Angeles/Japan version) (1 time) – with Seiji Sakaguchi
 WWF International Heavyweight Championship (1 time)
 G1 Climax (1996)
 Super Grade Tag League (1992) – with Shinya Hashimoto
 Six Man Tag Team Cup League (1988) – with Antonio Inoki and Kantaro Hoshino
 World Cup Tournament (1989)
 Pro Wrestling Illustrated
 PWI ranked him #55 of the 500 best singles wrestlers in the PWI 500 in 1993
 PWI ranked him #30 of the 500 best singles wrestlers during the "PWI Years" in 2003
 PWI ranked him #17, and #25 of the 100 best tag team of the "PWI Years" with Yoshiaki Yatsu and Animal Hamaguchi, respectively, in 2003
 Tokyo Sports
 Distinguished Service Award (1983)
 Effort Award (1977)
 Fighting Spirit Award (1979, 1986, 1988, 1989)
 Match of the Year Award (1983) vs. Tatsumi Fujinami on April 3
 Match of the Year Award (1984) vs. Antonio Inoki on August 2
 Match of the Year Award (1985) vs. Jumbo Tsuruta on November 4
 Match of the Year Award (1993) vs. Genichiro Tenryu on January 4
 Service Award (1997)
 Technique Award (1981)
 Universal Wrestling Association
 UWA World Heavyweight Championship (1 time)
 UWA World Tag Team Championship (1 time) – with Gran Hamada
 Wrestling Observer Newsletter
 Best Booker (1992)
 Promoter of the Year (1995, 1996, 1997)
 Wrestler of the Year (1987)
 Wrestling Observer Newsletter Hall of Fame (Class of 1996)

References

External links
 

1951 births
IWGP Heavyweight champions
Japanese male sport wrestlers
Japanese male professional wrestlers
Japanese people of Korean descent
Living people
Naturalized citizens of Japan
Olympic wrestlers of South Korea
Professional wrestling executives
Senshu University alumni
South Korean emigrants to Japan
South Korean male sport wrestlers
South Korean male professional wrestlers
Sportspeople from Yamaguchi Prefecture
Wrestlers at the 1972 Summer Olympics
Zainichi Korean people
IWGP Heavyweight Tag Team Champions
UWA World Tag Team Champions
20th-century professional wrestlers
21st-century professional wrestlers
UWA World Heavyweight Champions
NWA North American Tag Team Champions (Los Angeles/Japan version)
NWA International Tag Team Champions
PWF World Heavyweight Champions